This is a summary of the electoral history of Boris Johnson, the Member of Parliament for Uxbridge and South Ruislip since 2015 and Prime Minister of the United Kingdom from 2019 to 2022. He also served as Mayor of London from 2008 to 2016 and Foreign Secretary from 2016 to 2018.

Parliamentary elections

1997 general election, Clwyd South

2001 general election, Henley

2005 general election, Henley

2015 general election, Uxbridge and South Ruislip

2017 general election, Uxbridge and South Ruislip

2019 general election, Uxbridge and South Ruislip

Mayoral elections

2008 London mayoral election

2012 London mayoral election

2019 Conservative Party leadership election

2019 United Kingdom general election

References

Boris Johnson
Johnson, Boris
Johnson, Boris